KWTH (91.3 FM) is a radio station broadcasting a Religious format, licensed to Barstow, California, serving the Barstow area, the Victor Valley area, and along I-15 from the Cajon Pass to Baker and I-40 to Essex.

History
KWTH originally went on the air in 2006 as a part of a quadrocast with KWTW in Bishop, California, KWTM in June Lake, California, and KWTD in Ridgecrest, California, as well as 5 translators, known as the Living Proof Radio Network, which is a ministry of Calvary Chapel in Bishop.

On August 26, 2007; translator K284AU at 104.7 FM licensed to Clark Mountain was added to extend the coverage along the I-15 into Primm, Nevada.

On October 5, 2010; KWTH changed ownership to Penfold Communications. It was announced in Living Proof's quarterly newsletter that KWTH would be changing hands in late October or early November and that Living Proof would truly miss being able to serve the Barstow and Victor Valley communities, and encouraged people to listen on KWTD 91.9 FM as they traveled across to the western portion of the High Desert. KWTH continued to simulcast the feed of the Living Proof Radio Network until October 27, 2010, when KWTH began simulcasting KRTM in Yucca Valley, California. Later, KRTM also began simulcasting on KKRS in Davenport, Washington, KTWD in Wallace, Idaho, and WKJA in Brunswick, Ohio as well as several translators.

On November 8, 2010; translator K295AJ at 98.1 FM in North Las Vegas, Nevada was added to extend coverage into the Las Vegas Valley.

On August 11, 2011; KWTH changed ownership to Calvary Chapel Costa Mesa, and continued to simulcast the feed of the KRTM Radio Network until August 16, 2011, when it began simulcasting the HD2 channel of K-Wave 107.9 in San Clemente, California, which airs a commercial-free and jockless parallel of all exactly the same programs as the analog signal. As of December 2012 KWVE-HD2 station has ceased broadcasting and KWVE-FM only operates on HD1.

External links

Radio stations established in 1985
1985 establishments in California
WTH